Platinum & Gold Collection, released in 2004, is the second greatest hits compilation by Toni Braxton, following Ultimate Toni Braxton released in 2003. It is a budget CD with fewer songs than Ultimate, but it has the remix versions of some songs. Although the album was not given a proper release in the United States and is considered an international release, it has sold 281,518 copies in the US as of February 2012.

Background and content 
After failing to spawn any substantial hits of her last two albums, "Snowflakes" (2001) and "More Than a Woman" (2002), Braxton released her first compilation album, "Ultimate Toni Braxton", in 2003. Later, in 2004, BMG Heritage Records released her second greatest hits compilation, titled Platinum & Gold compilation. The collection includes 12 tracks, such as her hits "He Wasn't Man Enough", "Another Sad Love Song," "Breathe Again," "You Mean the World to Me," "Un-Break My Heart," but not "You're Makin' Me High". The album also features the non-single "A Better Man", taken from "More Than a Woman".

Critical reception 

Jason Birchmeier of AllMusic wrote, "Platinum & Gold Collection rounds up and remasters most of substantial hits from Braxton's past, in the process showcasing just how many great songs she'd recorded back in the mid-'90s, when she was among the biggest of big stars. However, he didn't like the inclusion of A Better Man and Hit the Freeway, writing that, "these songs are good, but they're not great, especially relative to songs like, say, 'You're Makin' Me High,' one of Braxton's best and one that's unfortunately missing here (a very glaring omission). So while Braxton's Platinum & Gold Collection is a nice compilation -- one that includes many of her most memorable hits and does so in first-rate fashion, in terms of remastering as well as packaging -- it's a compilation that is sure to leave you unsatisfied. You'd be better off spending the extra money to pick up a more definitive collection like the 18-track 'Ultimate Toni Braxton' from 2003 than this 50-minute budget-line CD."

Track listing

Charts 
"Platinum & Gold Collection" peaked at number 78 on the Billboard's Top R&B Albums chart, spending 5 weeks on the chart, selling over 281,518 copies in the US as of February 2012.

References 

2004 greatest hits albums
Toni Braxton compilation albums